The 2013 New York Mets season was the franchise's 52nd season. The Mets hosted the 84th MLB All-Star Game on July 16 at Citi Field, their home for five seasons. The Mets finished the season with a record of 74–88, finishing third in the National League East Division. The season was the Mets' first non-fourth-place finish since 2008.  It was also the final season for Ralph Kiner, who had been with their broadcast team since its first season.

Offseason
The Mets lost their rights to the Minor League Baseball affiliate Buffalo Bisons as their AAA team. For 2013–15, the Mets have agreed to a deal to claim the Las Vegas 51s as their newest minor league affiliate, for Triple A.

On November 7, 2012, the Mets and outfielder Jason Bay agreed to part ways, with the team buying out the $21 million remaining on his contract and releasing him.

On December 17, the Mets and the Toronto Blue Jays agreed to a deal sending 2012 Cy Young Award winner R. A. Dickey, Josh Thole and Mike Nickeas to Toronto in exchange for prospects Travis d'Arnaud, Noah Syndergaard, and Wuilmer Becerra and veteran catcher John Buck.

Regular season
On May 30, the Mets swept the Yankees for the second time in the history of the modern Subway Series.  The Yankees had swept six games from the Mets in 2003.

On August 30, 2013, the Mets traded catcher John Buck and outfielder Marlon Byrd through the waiver process, to the Pittsburgh Pirates. The Mets received reliever Vic Black and Dilson Herrera.

On September 1, 2013, Sandy Alderson announced he expects manager Terry Collins to not be fired by the club. Fans and certain media members have been publicly criticizing Collins' moves in games, and his general managing presence, and repertoire.

Season standings

National League East

National League Division Champs

Record vs. opponents

Game log

|-  style="text-align:center; background:#bbffbb"
| 1 || April 1 || Padres || 11–2 || Jon Niese (1–0) || Edinson Vólquez (0–1) ||  || Citi Field (41,053) || 1–0
|-  style="text-align:center; background:#bbffbb"
| 2 || April 3 || Padres || 8–4 || Matt Harvey (1–0) || Clayton Richard (0–1) ||  || Citi Field (22,239) || 2–0
|-  style="text-align:center; background:#ffbbbb"
| 3 || April 4 || Padres || 1–2 || Eric Stults (1–0) || Dillon Gee (0–1) || Huston Street (1) || Citi Field (21,519) || 2–1
|-  style="text-align:center; background:#ffbbbb"
| 4 || April 5 || Marlins || 5–7 || Alex Sanabia (1–0)  || Jeremy Hefner (0–1) ||  || Citi Field (24,935)|| 2–2
|-  style="text-align:center; background:#bbffbb"
| 5 || April 6 || Marlins || 7–3 || Brandon Lyon (1–0)  || Ryan Webb (0–1) ||  || Citi Field (28,474) || 3–2
|-  style="text-align:center; background:#bbffbb"
| 6 || April 7 || Marlins || 4–3 || Scott Rice (1–0) || Steve Cishek (0–1) ||  || Citi Field (29,780) || 4–2
|-  style="text-align:center; background:#bbffbb"
| 7 || April 8 || @Phillies || 7–2 || Matt Harvey (2–0) || Roy Halladay (0–2) ||  || Citizens Bank Park (35,393) || 5–2
|-  style="text-align:center; background:#ffbbbb"
| 8 || April 9 || @Phillies || 3–8 || Cliff Lee (2–0) || Dillon Gee (0–2) ||  || Citizens Bank Park (38,305) || 5–3
|-  style="text-align:center; background:#ffbbbb"
| 9 || April 10 || @Phillies || 3–7 || Kyle Kendrick (1–1) || Jeremy Hefner (0–2) ||  || Citizens Bank Park (38,715) || 5–4
|-  style="text-align:center; background:#bbffbb"
| 10 || April 12 || @Twins || 16–5 || Jon Niese (2–0)  ||  Vance Worley (0–2) ||  || Target Field (23,735) || 6–4
|-  style="text-align:center; background:#bbffbb"
| 11 || April 13 || @Twins || 4–2 ||  Matt Harvey (3–0) || Scott Diamond (0–1) || Bobby Parnell (1) || Target Field (28,804) || 7–4
|-  style="text-align:center; background:#bbbbbb"
|  || April 14 || @Twins ||colspan=4| Postponed (snow); Rescheduled for August 19 || Target Field ||
|-  style="text-align:center; background:#bbbbbb"
|  || April 15 || @Rockies || colspan=4| Postponed (snow); Rescheduled as split doubleheader on April 16 || Coors Field ||
|-  style="text-align:center; background:#ffbbbb"
| 12 || April 16 || @Rockies || 4–8 || Juan Nicasio (2–0) || Dillon Gee (0–3) ||  || Coors Field (21,510) || 7–5
|-  style="text-align:center; background:#ffbbbb"
| 13 || April 16 || @Rockies || 8–9 || Rafael Betancourt (1–0) || Greg Burke (0–1) ||  || Coors Field (20,239) || 7–6
|-  style="text-align:center; background:#bbbbbb"
|  || April 17 || @Rockies || colspan=4| Postponed (snow); Rescheduled for June 27  || Coors Field ||
|-  style="text-align:center; background:#ffbbbb"
| 14 || April 18 || @Rockies || 3–11 || Jon Garland (2–0) || Jon Niese (2–1) ||  || Coors Field (18,341) || 7–7
|-  style="text-align:center; background:#bbffbb"
| 15 || April 19 || Nationals ||7–1 || Matt Harvey (4–0) || Stephen Strasburg (1–3)  ||  || Citi Field (26,675) || 8–7
|-  style="text-align:center; background:#ffbbbb"
| 16 || April 20 || Nationals || 6–7  || Tyler Clippard (1–0)  || Josh Edgin (0–1) || Rafael Soriano (6) || Citi Field (24,325) || 8–8
|-  style="text-align:center; background:#bbffbb"
| 17 || April 21 || Nationals || 2–0 || Dillon Gee (1–3) || Jordan Zimmermann (3–1) || Bobby Parnell (2) || Citi Field (26,225) || 9–8
|-  style="text-align:center; background:#ffbbbb"
| 18 || April 23 || Dodgers || 2–7 || Ronald Belisario (1–2) || Brandon Lyon (1–1) ||  || Citi Field (21,135) || 9–9
|-  style="text-align:center; background:#bbffbb"
| 19 || April 24 || Dodgers || 7–3 (10) || Bobby Parnell (1–0) || Josh Wall (0–1) ||  || Citi Field (24,130) || 10–9
|-  style="text-align:center; background:#ffbbbb"
| 20 || April 25 || Dodgers || 2–3 || Kenley Jansen (1–0) || Scott Rice (1–1) || Brandon League (6) || Citi Field (24,851) || 10–10
|-  style="text-align:center; background:#ffbbbb"
| 21 || April 26 || Phillies || 0–4 || Kyle Kendrick (2–1) || Dillon Gee (1–4) ||  || Citi Field (21,582) || 10–11
|-  style="text-align:center; background:#ffbbbb"
| 22 || April 27 || Phillies || 4–9 || Jonathan Pettibone (1–0) || Shaun Marcum (0–1) ||  || Citi Field (29,248) || 10–12
|-  style="text-align:center; background:#ffbbbb"
| 23 || April 28 || Phillies || 1–5 || Cole Hamels (1–3) || Jon Niese (2–2) ||  || Citi Field (28,990) || 10–13
|-  style="text-align:center; background:#ffbbbb"
| 24 || April 29 || @Marlins || 3–4 (15) || Jon Rauch (1–2) || Shaun Marcum (0–2) ||  || Marlins Park (15,605) || 10–14
|-  style="text-align:center; background:#ffbbbb"
| 25 || April 30 || @Marlins || 1–2 || Ryan Webb (1–1) || Jeremy Hefner (0–3) ||  || Marlins Park (15,018) || 10–15
|-

|-  style="text-align:center; background:#bbffbb"
| 26 || May 1 || @Marlins || 7–6 || Dillon Gee (2–4) || A. J. Ramos (0–1) || Bobby Parnell (3) || Marlins Park (16,188) || 11–15
|-  style="text-align:center; background:#bbffbb"
| 27 || May 3 || @Braves || 7–5 || Bobby Parnell (2–0) || Jordan Walden (1–1) || Jeurys Familia (1) || Turner Field (30,871) ||  12–15
|-  style="text-align:center; background:#bbbbbb"
|  || May 4 || @Braves || colspan=4| Postponed (rain); Rescheduled as split doubleheader on June 18 || Turner Field ||
|-  style="text-align:center; background:#ffbbbb"
| 28 || May 5 || @Braves || 4–9 || Tim Hudson (4–1) || Jon Niese (2–3) ||  || Turner Field (32,849) || 12–16
|-  style="text-align:center; background:#bbffbb"
| 29 || May 7 || White Sox || 1–0 (10) || Bobby Parnell (3–0) || Nate Jones (0–3) ||  || Citi Field (23,394) || 13–16
|-  style="text-align:center; background:#ffbbbb"
| 30 || May 8 || White Sox || 3–6 || Jake Peavy (4–1) || Jeremy Hefner (0–4) ||  || Citi Field (21,470) || 13–17
|-  style="text-align:center; background:#bbffbb"
| 31 || May 9 || Pirates || 3–2 || Bobby Parnell (4–0)  || Jason Grilli (0–1) ||  || Citi Field (20,147) || 14–17
|-  style="text-align:center; background:#ffbbbb"
| 32 || May 10 || Pirates || 3–7 || Wandy Rodríguez (3–2) || Shaun Marcum (0–3) || Jason Grilli (14) || Citi Field (25,123) || 14–18
|-  style="text-align:center; background:#ffbbbb"
| 33 || May 11 || Pirates || 2–11 || Francisco Liriano (1–0) || Jon Niese (2–4) ||  || Citi Field (31,160) || 14–19
|-  style="text-align:center; background:#ffbbbb"
| 34 || May 12 || Pirates || 2–3 || Justin Wilson (3–0) || Scott Rice (1–2) || Jason Grilli (15) || Citi Field (28,404) || 14–20
|-  style="text-align:center; background:#ffbbbb"
| 35 || May 13 || @Cardinals || 3–6 || Lance Lynn (6–1) || Scott Rice (1–3) || Edward Mujica (10) || Busch Stadium (38,412) || 14–21
|-  style="text-align:center; background:#ffbbbb"
| 36 || May 14 || @Cardinals || 4–10 || John Gast (1–0) || Dillon Gee (2–5) ||  || Busch Stadium (37,460) || 14–22
|-  style="text-align:center; background:#ffbbbb"
| 37 || May 15 || @Cardinals || 2–4 || Seth Maness (3–0) || Shaun Marcum (0–4) || Edward Mujica (11) || Busch Stadium (38,143) || 14–23
|-  style="text-align:center; background:#bbffbb"
| 38 || May 16 || @Cardinals || 5–2 || Jon Niese (3–4) || Adam Wainwright (5–3) || Bobby Parnell (4) || Busch Stadium (44,068) || 15–23
|-  style="text-align:center; background:#bbffbb"
| 39 || May 17 || @Cubs || 3–2 || Matt Harvey (5–0) || Edwin Jackson (1–6) || Bobby Parnell (5) || Wrigley Field (34,890) || 16–23
|-  style="text-align:center; background:#ffbbbb"
| 40 || May 18 || @Cubs || 2–8 || Scott Feldman (4–3) || Jeremy Hefner (0–5) ||  || Wrigley Field (38,766) || 16–24
|-  style="text-align:center; background:#bbffbb"
| 41 || May 19 || @Cubs || 4–3 || Scott Rice (2–3) || Kyuji Fujikawa (1–1) || Bobby Parnell (6) || Wrigley Field (34,258) || 17–24
|-  style="text-align:center; background:#ffbbbb"
| 42 || May 20 || Reds || 3–4 || Johnny Cueto (2–0) || Shaun Marcum (0–5) || Aroldis Chapman (9) || Citi Field (23,038) || 17–25
|-  style="text-align:center; background:#ffbbbb"
| 43 || May 21 || Reds || 0–4 || Mike Leake (4–2) || Jon Niese (3–5) ||  || Citi Field (23,183) || 17–26
|-  style="text-align:center; background:#ffbbbb"
| 44 || May 22 || Reds || 4–7 || Alfredo Simón (4–1) || Bobby Parnell (4–1) || Aroldis Chapman (10) || Citi Field (30,415) || 17–27
|-  style="text-align:center; background:#ffbbbb"
| 45 || May 24 || Braves ||5–7 (10)  || Anthony Varvaro (2–0)  || Brandon Lyon (1–2)  || Craig Kimbrel (15) || Citi Field (32,325) || 17–28
|-  style="text-align:center; background:#ffbbbb"
| 46 || May 25 || Braves || 0–6 || Mike Minor (6–2)  || Dillon Gee (2–6) ||  || Citi Field (27,622)|| 17–29
|-  style="text-align:center; background:#bbffbb"
| 47 || May 26 || Braves || 4–2 || LaTroy Hawkins (1–0) || Cory Gearrin (1–1) || Bobby Parnell (7)  || Citi Field (27,296) || 18–29
|-  style="text-align:center; background:#bbffbb"
| 48 || May 27 || Yankees || 2–1 || Brandon Lyon (2–2) || David Robertson (3–1) || Bobby Parnell (8) || Citi Field (32,911) || 19–29
|-  style="text-align:center; background:#bbffbb"
| 49 || May 28 || Yankees  || 2–1 || Scott Rice (3–3) || Mariano Rivera (0–1) ||  || Citi Field (31,877) || 20–29
|-  style="text-align:center; background:#bbffbb"
| 50 || May 29 || @Yankees || 9–4 || Jeremy Hefner (1–5) || David Phelps (3–3) ||  || Yankee Stadium (43,681) || 21–29
|-  style="text-align:center; background:#bbffbb"
| 51 || May 30 || @Yankees || 3–1 || Dillon Gee (3–6) || Vidal Nuño (1–2) || Bobby Parnell (9) || Yankee Stadium (44,207) || 22–29
|-  style="text-align:center; background:#ffbbbb"
| 52 || May 31 || @Marlins || 1–5 || Jacob Turner (1–0) || Shaun Marcum (0–6) ||  || Marlins Park (16,493) || 22–30
|-

|-  style="text-align:center; background:#ffbbbb"
| 53 || June 1 || @Marlins || 1–8 || José Fernández (3–3) || Collin McHugh (0–1) ||  || Marlins Park (16,283) || 22–31
|-  style="text-align:center; background:#ffbbbb"
| 54 || June 2 || @Marlins || 6–11 || Wade LeBlanc (1–5) || Scott Rice (3–4) ||  || Marlins Park (18,434) || 22–32
|-  style="text-align:center; background:#ffbbbb"
| 55 || June 4 || @Nationals || 2–3 || Tyler Clippard (4–1) || Bobby Parnell (4–2) ||  || Nationals Park (31,473) || 22–33
|-  style="text-align:center; background:#bbffbb"
| 56 || June 5 || @Nationals || 10–1 || Dillon Gee (4–6) || Dan Haren (4–7) ||  || Nationals Park (36,155) || 23–33
|-  style="text-align:center; background:#bbbbbb"
| || June 6 || @Nationals || colspan=4| Postponed (rain); Rescheduled as split doubleheader on July 26 || Nationals Park ||
|-  style="text-align:center; background:#bbbbbb"
| || June 7 || Marlins || colspan=4| Postponed (rain); Rescheduled as doubleheader on September 14 || Citi Field ||
|-  style="text-align:center; background:#ffbbbb"
| 57 || June 8 || Marlins || 1–2 (20) || Kevin Slowey (2–5) || Shaun Marcum (0–7) || Steve Cishek (6) || Citi Field (20,338) || 23–34
|-  style="text-align:center; background:#ffbbbb"
| 58 || June 9 || Marlins || 4–8 (10) || Chad Qualls (1–0) || Bobby Parnell (4–3) ||  || Citi Field (21,747) || 23–35
|-  style="text-align:center; background:#ffbbbb"
| 59 || June 11 || Cardinals || 2–9 || Michael Wacha (1–0) || Jeremy Hefner (1–6) ||  || Citi Field (21,581) || 23–36
|-  style="text-align:center; background:#bbffbb"
| 60 || June 12 || Cardinals || 5–1 || Dillon Gee (5–6) || Shelby Miller (7–4) ||  || Citi Field (23,331) || 24–36
|-  style="text-align:center; background:#ffbbbb"
| 61 || June 13 || Cardinals || 1–2 || Adam Wainwright (10–3) || Matt Harvey (5–1) || Edward Mujica (19) || Citi Field (25,471) || 24–37
|-  style="text-align:center; background:#ffbbbb"
| 62 || June 14 || Cubs || 3–6 || Edwin Jackson (3–8) || Shaun Marcum (0–8) || Kevin Gregg (8) || Citi Field (32,208) || 24–38
|-  style="text-align:center; background:#ffbbbb"
| 63 || June 15 || Cubs || 2–5 || Scott Feldman (6–5) || Jon Niese (3–6) || Kevin Gregg (9) || Citi Field (27,004) || 24–39
|-  style="text-align:center; background:#bbffbb"
| 64 || June 16 || Cubs || 4–3 || Bobby Parnell (5–3) || Carlos Mármol (2–4) ||  || Citi Field (30,256) || 25–39
|-  style="text-align:center; background:#ffbbbb"
| 65 || June 17 || @Braves || 1–2 || David Carpenter (1–0) || Dillon Gee (5–7) ||  || Turner Field (22,048) || 25–40
|-  style="text-align:center; background:#bbffbb"
| 66 || June 18 || @Braves || 4–3 || Matt Harvey (6–1) || Alex Wood (0–1) || Bobby Parnell (10) || Turner Field (21,857) || 26–40
|-  style="text-align:center; background:#bbffbb"
| 67 || June 18 || @Braves || 6–1 || Zack Wheeler (1–0) || Paul Maholm (7–6) ||  || Turner Field (21,073) || 27–40
|-  style="text-align:center; background:#ffbbbb"
| 68 || June 19 || @Braves || 3–5 || Kris Medlen (4–7) || Shaun Marcum (0–9) || Craig Kimbrel (20) || Turner Field (21,852) || 27–41
|-  style="text-align:center; background:#bbffbb"
| 69 || June 20 || @Braves || 4–3 || LaTroy Hawkins (2–0) || Mike Minor (8–3) || Bobby Parnell (11) || Turner Field (33,824) || 28–41
|-  style="text-align:center; background:#bbffbb"
| 70 || June 21 || @Phillies || 4–3 || Jeremy Hefner (2–6) || Cole Hamels (2–11) || Bobby Parnell (12) || Citizens Bank Park (40,062) || 29–41
|-  style="text-align:center; background:#ffbbbb"
| 71 || June 22 || @Phillies || 7–8 || Jonathan Papelbon (2–0) || Carlos Torres (0–1) || || Citizens Bank Park (45,725) || 29–42
|-  style="text-align:center; background:#bbffbb"
| 72 || June 23 || @Phillies || 8–0 || Matt Harvey (7–1) || John Lannan (0–2) ||  || Citizens Bank Park (44,951) || 30–42
|-  style="text-align:center; background:#ffbbbb"
| 73 || June 25 || @White Sox || 4–5 || Addison Reed (3–0) || LaTroy Hawkins (2–1) ||  || U.S. Cellular Field (20,789) || 30–43
|-  style="text-align:center; background:#bbffbb"
| 74 || June 26 || @White Sox || 3–0 || Shaun Marcum (1–9) || John Danks (1–5) || Bobby Parnell (13) || U.S. Cellular Field (18,249) || 31–43
|-  style="text-align:center; background:#bbffbb"
| 75 || June 27 || @Rockies || 3–2 || LaTroy Hawkins (3–1) || Matt Belisle (4–5) || Bobby Parnell (14) || Coors Field (34,387) || 32–43
|-  style="text-align:center; background:#ffbbbb"
| 76 || June 28 || Nationals || 4–6 || Tyler Clippard (6–1) || Bobby Parnell (5–4) || Drew Storen (2) || Citi Field (28,363) || 32–44
|-  style="text-align:center; background:#bbffbb"
| 77 || June 29 || Nationals || 5–1 || Dillon Gee (6–7) || Taylor Jordan (0–1) ||  || Citi Field (26,426) || 33–44
|-  style="text-align:center; background:#ffbbbb"
| 78 || June 30 || Nationals || 2–13 || Gio González (5–3) || Zack Wheeler (1–1) ||  || Citi Field (33,366) || 33–45
|-

|-  style="text-align:center; background:#bbffbb"
| 79 || July 1 || Diamondbacks || 5–4 (13) || David Aardsma (1–0) || Josh Collmenter (4–1) ||  || Citi Field (22,240) || 34–45
|-  style="text-align:center; background:#bbffbb"
| 80 || July 2 || Diamondbacks || 9–1 || Jeremy Hefner (3–6) || Patrick Corbin (9–1) ||  || Citi Field (21,500) || 35–45
|-  style="text-align:center; background:#ffbbbb"
| 81 || July 3 || Diamondbacks || 3–5 || Randall Delgado (1–2) || Matt Harvey (7–2) || Heath Bell (15) || Citi Field (41,257) || 35–46
|-  style="text-align:center; background:#ffbbbb"
| 82 || July 4 || Diamondbacks || 4–5 (15) || Chaz Roe (1–0) || Scott Rice (3–5) || Brad Ziegler (1) || Citi Field (24,224) || 35–47
|-  style="text-align:center; background:#bbffbb"
| 83 || July 5 || @Brewers || 12–5 || Zack Wheeler (2–1) || Johnny Hellweg (0–2) || Josh Edgin (1) || Miller Park (32,519) || 36–47
|-  style="text-align:center; background:#ffbbbb"
| 84 || July 6 || @Brewers || 6–7 || Yovani Gallardo (7–8) || Shaun Marcum (1–10) || Francisco Rodriguez (8) || Miller Park (31,619) || 36–48
|-  style="text-align:center; background:#bbffbb"
| 85 || July 7 || @Brewers || 2–1 || Jeremy Hefner (4–6) || Tom Gorzelanny (1–2) || Bobby Parnell (15) || Miller Park (39,677) || 37–48
|-  style="text-align:center; background:#bbffbb"
| 86 || July 8 || @Giants || 4–3 (16) || Josh Edgin (1–1) || George Kontos (2–2) || Bobby Parnell (16) || AT&T Park (41,497) || 38–48
|-  style="text-align:center; background:#bbffbb"
| 87 || July 9 || @Giants || 10–6 || Scott Rice (4–5) || José Mijares (0–2) ||  || AT&T Park (41,534) || 39–48
|-  style="text-align:center; background:#bbffbb"
| 88 || July 10 || @Giants || 7–2 || Zack Wheeler (3–1) || Matt Cain (5–6) ||  || AT&T Park (41,679) || 40–48
|-  style="text-align:center; background:#ffbbbb"
| 89 || July 12 || @Pirates || 2–3 (11) || Vin Mazzaro (5–2) || Gonzalez Germen (0–1) ||  || PNC Park (39,036) || 40–49
|-  style="text-align:center; background:#ffbbbb"
| 90 || July 13 || @Pirates || 2–4 || Justin Wilson (6–1) || Greg Burke (0–2) || Jason Grilli (29) || PNC Park (39,173) || 40–50
|-  style="text-align:center; background:#bbffbb"
| 91 || July 14 || @Pirates || 4–2 || Dillon Gee (7–7) || Gerrit Cole (4–3) || Bobby Parnell (17) || PNC Park (37,490) || 41–50
|-  style="text-align:center; background:#bbb"
|    || July 16 || A.L. @ N.L. || 0–3 ||colspan=3| 2013 Major League Baseball All-Star Game || Citi Field (45,186) ||
|-  style="text-align:center; background:#ffbbbb"
| 92 || July 19 || Phillies || 8–13 || Kyle Kendrick (9–6) || Jeremy Hefner (4–7) ||  || Citi Field (35,021) || 41–51
|-  style="text-align:center; background:#bbffbb"
| 93 || July 20 || Phillies || 5–4 || Gonzalez Germen (1–1) || Cole Hamels (4–12) || Bobby Parnell (18) || Citi Field (26,722) || 42–51
|-  style="text-align:center; background:#bbffbb"
| 94 || July 21 || Phillies || 5–0 || Matt Harvey (8–2) || Cliff Lee (10–4) ||  || Citi Field (32,127) || 43–51
|-  style="text-align:center; background:#ffbbbb"
| 95 || July 22 || Braves || 1–2 || Jordan Walden (4–1) || Bobby Parnell (5–5) || Craig Kimbrel (28) || Citi Field (25,111) || 43–52
|-  style="text-align:center; background:#bbffbb"
| 96 || July 23 || Braves || 4–1 || Carlos Torres (1–1) || Kris Medlen (6–10) || Bobby Parnell (19) || Citi Field (24,355) || 44–52
|-  style="text-align:center; background:#ffbbbb"
| 97 || July 24 || Braves || 2–8 || Tim Hudson (8–7) || Jeremy Hefner (4–8) ||  || Citi Field (28,194) || 44–53
|-  style="text-align:center; background:#bbffbb"
| 98 || July 25 || Braves || 7–4 || Zack Wheeler (4–1) || Kameron Loe (1–2) || Bobby Parnell (20) || Citi Field (35,793) || 45–53
|-  style="text-align:center; background:#bbffbb"
| 99 || July 26 || @Nationals || 11–0 || Jenrry Mejía (1–0) || Jordan Zimmermann (12–6) ||  || Nationals Park (33,858) || 46–53
|-  style="text-align:center; background:#ffbbbb"
| 100 || July 26 || @Nationals || 1–2 || Rafael Soriano (2–2) || LaTroy Hawkins (3–2) ||  || Nationals Park (33,689) || 46–54
|-  style="text-align:center; background:#ffbbbb"
| 101 || July 27 || @Nationals || 1–4 || Dan Haren (5–11) || Dillon Gee (7–8) || Rafael Soriano (26) || Nationals Park (37,464) || 46–55
|-  style="text-align:center; background:#ffbbbb"
| 102 || July 28 || @Nationals || 1–14 || Taylor Jordan (1–3) || Carlos Torres (1–2) ||  || Nationals Park (31,467) || 46–56
|-  style="text-align:center; background:#bbffbb"
| 103 || July 29 || @Marlins || 6–5 || David Aardsma (2–0) || A.J. Ramos (3–4) || Bobby Parnell (21) || Marlins Park (19,343) || 47–56
|-  style="text-align:center; background:#bbffbb"
| 104 || July 30 || @Marlins || 4–2 (10) || Scott Atchison (1–0) || Steve Cishek (3–6) || Bobby Parnell (22) || Marlins Park (23,408) || 48–56
|-  style="text-align:center; background:#ffbbbb"
| 105 || July 31 || @Marlins || 2–3 || Henderson Álvarez (2–1) || Jenrry Mejía (1–1) || Mike Dunn (2) || Marlins Park (18,714) || 48–57
|-

|-  style="text-align:center; background:#ffbbbb"
| 106 || August 1 || @Marlins || 0–3 || Tom Koehler (3–6) || Matt Harvey (8–3) || Steve Cishek (23) || Marlins Park (25,916) || 48–58
|-  style="text-align:center; background:#bbffbb"
| 107 || August 2 || Royals || 4–2 (11) || Carlos Torres (2–2) || Luis Mendoza (2–6) ||  || Citi Field (31,032) || 49–58
|-  style="text-align:center; background:#ffbbbb"
| 108 || August 3 || Royals || 3–4 (12) || Kelvin Herrera (4–5) || David Aardsma (2–1) || Greg Holland (29) || Citi Field (25,095) || 49–59
|-  style="text-align:center; background:#ffbbbb"
| 109 || August 4 || Royals || 2–6 || Ervin Santana (8–6) || Zack Wheeler (4–2) ||  || Citi Field (25,658) || 49–60
|-  style="text-align:center; background:#bbffbb"
| 110 || August 6 || Rockies || 3–2 || Scott Atchison (2–0) || Wilton López (1–4) || LaTroy Hawkins (1) || Citi Field (27,198) || 50–60
|-  style="text-align:center; background:#bbffbb"
| 111 || August 7 || Rockies || 5–0 || Matt Harvey (9–3) || Jhoulys Chacín (10–6) ||  || Citi Field (27,581) || 51–60
|-  style="text-align:center; background:#bbffbb"
| 112 || August 8 || Rockies || 2–1 || Dillon Gee (8–8) || Jeff Manship (0–1) || LaTroy Hawkins (2) || Citi Field (26,618) || 52–60
|-  style="text-align:center; background:#ffbbbb"
| 113 || August 9 || @Diamondbacks || 4–5 || Brad Ziegler (5–1) || Scott Atchison (2–1) ||  || Chase Field (25,187) || 52–61
|-  style="text-align:center; background:#bbffbb"
| 114 || August 10 || @Diamondbacks || 4–1 || Zack Wheeler (5–2) || Brandon McCarthy (2–6) || LaTroy Hawkins (3) || Chase Field (42,450) || 53–61
|-  style="text-align:center; background:#bbffbb"
| 115 || August 11 || @Diamondbacks || 9–5 || Jon Niese (4–6) || Zeke Spruill (0–2) ||  || Chase Field (28,260) || 54–61
|-  style="text-align:center; background:#ffbbbb"
| 116 || August 12 || @Dodgers || 2–4 || Ricky Nolasco (9–9) || Jenrry Mejía (1–2) || Kenley Jansen (18) || Dodger Stadium (42,915) || 54–62
|-  style="text-align:center; background:#ffbbbb"
| 117 || August 13 || @Dodgers || 2–4 || Hyun-Jin Ryu (12–3) || Matt Harvey (9–4) || Kenley Jansen (19) || Dodger Stadium (46,335) || 54–63
|-  style="text-align:center; background:#ffbbbb"
| 118 || August 14 || @Dodgers || 4–5 (12) || Paco Rodriguez (3–2) || Pedro Feliciano (0–1) ||  || Dodger Stadium (44,091) || 54–64
|-  style="text-align:center; background:#bbffbb"
| 119 || August 15 || @Padres || 4–1 || Scott Atchison (3–1) || Luke Gregerson (5–7) || González Germen (1) || Petco Park (21,400) || 55–64
|-  style="text-align:center; background:#bbffbb"
| 120 || August 16 || @Padres || 5–2 || Jon Niese (5–6) || Ian Kennedy (4–9) || LaTroy Hawkins (4) || Petco Park (25,604) || 56–64
|-  style="text-align:center; background:#ffbbbb"
| 121 || August 17 || @Padres || 2–8 || Edinson Vólquez (9–10) || David Aardsma (2–2) ||  || Petco Park (36,974) || 56–65
|-  style="text-align:center; background:#ffbbbb"
| 122 || August 18 || @Padres || 3–4 || Huston Street (1–4) || Pedro Feliciano (0–2) ||  || Petco Park (24,704) || 56–66
|-  style="text-align:center; background:#bbffbb"
| 123 || August 19 || @Twins || 6–1 || Dillon Gee (9–8) || Kyle Gibson (2–4) ||  || Target Field (30,913) || 57–66
|-  style="text-align:center; background:#bbffbb"
| 124 || August 20 || Braves || 5–3 || Zack Wheeler (6–2) || Brandon Beachy (2–1) || LaTroy Hawkins (5) || Citi Field (25,863) || 58–66
|-  style="text-align:center; background:#ffbbbb"
| 125 || August 21 || Braves || 1–4 (10) || Luis Avilán (5–0) || Scott Atchison (3–2) || Craig Kimbrel (40) || Citi Field (22,935) || 58–67
|-  style="text-align:center; background:#ffbbbb"
| 126 || August 23 || Tigers || 1–6 || Doug Fister (11–6) || Daisuke Matsuzaka (0–1) ||  || Citi Field (37,023) || 58–68
|-  style="text-align:center; background:#ffbbbb"
| 127 || August 24 || Tigers || 0–3 || Max Scherzer (19–1) || Matt Harvey (9–5) || Joaquín Benoit (17) || Citi Field (35,636) || 58–69
|-  style="text-align:center; background:#ffbbbb"
| 128 || August 25 || Tigers || 3–11 || Rick Porcello (10–7) || Dillon Gee (9–9) ||  || Citi Field (32,084) || 58–70
|-  style="text-align:center; background:#ffbbbb"
| 129 || August 26 || Phillies || 1–2 || Cliff Lee (11–6) || Zack Wheeler (6–3) || Jonathan Papelbon (22) || Citi Field (25,784) || 58–71
|-  style="text-align:center; background:#bbffbb"
| 130 || August 27 || Phillies || 5–0 || Jon Niese (6–6) || Kyle Kendrick (10–11) ||  || Citi Field (25,700) || 59–71
|-  style="text-align:center; background:#ffbbbb"
| 131 || August 28 || Phillies || 2–6 || Cole Hamels (6–13) || Daisuke Matsuzaka (0–2) ||  || Citi Field (24,447) || 59–72
|-  style="text-align:center; background:#bbffbb"
| 132 || August 29 || Phillies || 11–3 || Carlos Torres (3–1) || Ethan Martin (2–3) ||  || Citi Field (22,008) || 60–72
|-  style="text-align:center; background:#bbffbb"
| 133 || August 30 || @Nationals || 3–2 || Dillon Gee (10–9) || Jordan Zimmerman (15–8) || LaTroy Hawkins (6) || Nationals Park (35,008) || 61–72
|-  style="text-align:center; background:#bbffbb"
| 134 || August 31 || @Nationals || 11–3 || Zack Wheeler (7–3) || Dan Haren (8–12) ||  || Nationals Park (34,481) || 62–72
|-

|-  style="text-align:center; background:#ffbbbb"
| 135 || September 1 || @Nationals || 5–6 || Erik Davis (1–0) || González Germen (1–2) || Rafael Soriano (36) || Nationals Park (28,995) || 62–73
|-  style="text-align:center; background:#ffbbbb"
| 136 || September 2 || @Braves || 5–13 || Paul Maholm (10–10) || Daisuke Matsuzaka (0–3) ||  || Turner Field (26,530) || 62–74
|-  style="text-align:center; background:#ffbbbb"
| 137 || September 3 || @Braves || 1–3 || Kris Medlen (12–12) || Carlos Torres (3–3) || Craig Kimbrel (44) || Turner Field (21,221) || 62–75
|-  style="text-align:center; background:#bbffbb"
| 138 || September 4 || @Braves || 5–2 || Dillon Gee (11–9) || Kameron Loe (1–3) || LaTroy Hawkins (7) || Turner Field (22,946) || 63–75
|-  style="text-align:center; background:#ffbbbb"
| 139 || September 6 || @Indians || 1–8 || Scott Kazmir (8–7) || Zack Wheeler (7–4) ||  || Progressive Field (15,962) || 63–76
|-  style="text-align:center; background:#ffbbbb"
| 140 || September 7 || @Indians || 4–9 || Corey Kluber (8–5) || Jon Niese (6–7) ||  || Progressive Field (21,453) || 63–77
|-  style="text-align:center; background:#bbffbb"
| 141 || September 8 || @Indians || 2–1 || Frank Francisco (1–0) || Chris Perez (5–3) || LaTroy Hawkins (8) || Progressive Field (13,317) || 64–77
|-  style="text-align:center; background:#ffbbbb"
| 142 || September 9 || Nationals || 0–9 || Gio González (10–6) || Carlos Torres (3–4) ||  || Citi Field (20,174) || 64–78
|-  style="text-align:center; background:#ffbbbb"
| 143 || September 10 || Nationals || 3–6 || Jordan Zimmerman (17–8) || Dillon Gee (11–10) || Rafael Soriano (40) || Citi Field (20,307) || 64–79
|-  style="text-align:center; background:#ffbbbb"
| 144 || September 11 || Nationals || 0–3 || Dan Haren (9–13) || Zack Wheeler (7–5) || Rafael Soriano (41) || Citi Field (20,151) || 64–80
|-  style="text-align:center; background:#ffbbbb"
| 145 || September 12 || Nationals || 2–7 || Tanner Roark (6–0) || Aaron Harang (0–1) ||  || Citi Field (20,484) || 64–81
|-  style="text-align:center; background:#bbffbb"
| 146 || September 13 || Marlins || 4–3 || Jon Niese (7–7) || Brad Hand (0–1) || LaTroy Hawkins (9) || Citi Field (20,562) || 65–81
|-  style="text-align:center; background:#ffbbbb"
| 147 || September 14 || Marlins || 0–3 || Henderson Álvarez (4–4) || Carlos Torres (3–5) || Steve Cishek (30) || Citi Field || 65–82
|-  style="text-align:center; background:#bbffbb"
| 148 || September 14 || Marlins || 3–1 || Daisuke Matsuzaka (1–3) || Jacob Turner (3–7) || LaTroy Hawkins (10) || Citi Field (25,175) || 66–82
|-  style="text-align:center; background:#bbffbb"
| 149 || September 15 || Marlins || 1–0 (12) || Vic Black (1–0) || Zach Phillips (0–1) ||  || Citi Field (25,165) || 67–82
|-  style="text-align:center; background:#ffbbbb"
| 150 || September 17 || Giants || 5–8 || Yusmeiro Petit (4–0) || Sean Henn (0–1) ||  || Citi Field (24,343) || 67–83
|-  style="text-align:center; background:#bbffbb"
| 151 || September 18 || Giants || 5–4 || Vic Black (2–0) || Sergio Romo (4–8) ||  || Citi Field (23,698) || 68–83
|-  style="text-align:center; background:#ffbbbb"
| 152 || September 19 || Giants || 1–2 || Madison Bumgarner (13–9) || Jon Niese (7–8) || Javier López (1) || Citi Field (22,897) || 68–84
|-  style="text-align:center; background:#bbffbb"
| 153 || September 20 || @Phillies || 6–4 || Daisuke Matsuzaka (2–3) || Cole Hamels (8–14) || LaTroy Hawkins (11) || Citizens Bank Park (33,117) || 69–84
|-  style="text-align:center; background:#bbffbb"
| 154 || September 21 || @Phillies || 5–4 (7) || Dillon Gee (12–10) || Tyler Cloyd (2–6) ||  || Citizens Bank Park (36,650) || 70–84
|-  style="text-align:center; background:#bbffbb"
| 155 || September 22 || @Phillies || 4–3 || Carlos Torres (4–5) || Cliff Lee (14–7) || LaTroy Hawkins (12) || Citizens Bank Park (44,398) || 71–84
|-  style="text-align:center; background:#ffbbbb"
| 156 || September 23 || @Reds || 2–3 (10) || Manny Parra (2–3) || Greg Burke (0–3) ||  || Great American Ball Park (21,269) || 71–85
|-  style="text-align:center; background:#bbffbb"
| 157 || September 24 || @Reds || 4–2 || Jon Niese (8–8) || Mike Leake (14–7) || Vic Black (1) || Great American Ball Park (28,887) || 72–85
|-  style="text-align:center; background:#bbffbb"
| 158 || September 25 || @Reds || 1–0 || Daisuke Matsuzaka (3–3) || Mat Latos (14–7) || LaTroy Hawkins (13) || Great American Ball Park (26,223) || 73–85
|-  style="text-align:center; background:#ffbbbb"
| 159 || September 26 || Brewers || 2–4 || Alfredo Figaro (3–3) || Dillon Gee (12–11) || Jim Henderson (27) || Citi Field (21,350) || 73–86
|-  style="text-align:center; background:#ffbbbb"
| 160 || September 27 || Brewers || 2–4 || Yovani Gallardo (12–10) || Carlos Torres (4–6) || Jim Henderson (28) || Citi Field (25,276) || 73–87
|-  style="text-align:center; background:#ffbbbb"
| 161 || September 28 || Brewers || 2–4 (10) || Donovan Hand (1–5) || Scott Atchison (3–3) || Alfredo Figaro (1) || Citi Field (29,326) || 73–88
|-  style="text-align:center; background:#bbffbb"
| 162 || September 29 || Brewers || 3–2 || Vic Black (3–0) || Brandon Kintzler (3–3) || Frank Francisco (1) || Citi Field (41,891) || 74–88
|-

Roster

Farm system

LEAGUE CHAMPIONS: Savannah

References

External links

 2013 New York Mets season Official Site
 2013 New York Mets season at Baseball Reference
 2013 New York Mets season at ESPN

New York Mets seasons
New York Mets season
New York Mets
2010s in Queens
Flushing, Queens